Jay M. Bargeron is a United States Marine Corps major general who serves as the commanding general of the 3rd Marine Division since November 8, 2021. He most recently served as the President of the Marine Corps University from 2019 to 2021. Previously, he served as the Deputy Director of Plans and Operations of the United States European Command.

References

External links

Year of birth missing (living people)
Living people
Place of birth missing (living people)
United States Marine Corps generals